The following is an overview of 1932 in film, including significant events, a list of films released and notable births and deaths.

Top-grossing films (U.S.)
The top ten 1932 released films by box office gross in North America are as follows:

Events
The Film Daily Yearbook listed the following as the ten leading headline events of the year.
 Sidney Kent leaves Paramount Pictures and joins Fox Film.
 Merlin H Aylesworth succeeds Hiram S Brown as president of RKO.
 Jesse L. Lasky leaves Paramount and becomes an independent producer for Fox.
 Sam Katz leaves Paramount.
 James R Grainger leaves Fox and is succeeded by John D Clark, formerly of Paramount.
 Publix and Fox decentralization of cinemas.
 New industry program, including standard exhibition contract along lines of 5-5-5, proposed by Motion Picture Theater Owners of America and Allied.
 Joe Brandt retires from Columbia Pictures joins World-Wide and later resigns again.
 Two Radio City theaters open, under direction of "Roxy", with coincident acquisition of the Rockefeller interests of 100,000 shares of RKO stock and 100,000 shares of RCA stock.
 Experimentation with exclusive runs.

Other notable events include:
 Ingrid Bergman's film career begins
Cary Grant's film career begins
Katharine Hepburn's film career begins
Shirley Temple's film career begins
Disney releases Flowers and Trees, the first cartoon in three-strip Technicolor
Santa, first sound film made in Mexico, released
The term "Tollywood" is first used to describe the cinema of West Bengal, based at Tollygunge

Top Ten Money Making Stars
Exhibitors selected the following as the Top Ten Money Making Stars for 1931–1932 in Quigley Publishing Company's first annual poll.

Academy Awards

The 5th Academy Awards were conducted by the Academy of Motion Picture Arts and Sciences on November 18, 1932, at a ceremony held at The Ambassador Hotel in Los Angeles, California. The ceremony was hosted by Conrad Nagel. Films screened in Los Angeles between August 1, 1931, and July 31, 1932, were eligible to receive awards.

Major awards:
 Best Picture: Grand Hotel – Metro-Goldwyn-Mayer
 Best Director: Frank Borzage – Bad Girl
 Best Actor: Fredric March – Dr. Jekyll and Mr. Hyde & Wallace Beery – The Champ 
 Best Actress: Helen Hayes – The Sin of Madelon Claudet

Note: Prior to 1933 awards were not based on calendar years, which is how there are no Best Actor, Best Actress or Best Director awards for 1932 films. The 1931–32 awards went to 1931 films.

1932 film releases
United States unless stated

January–March
January 1932
January 2
Emma
January 14
Union Depot
January 15
Forbidden
The Local Bad Man
January 16
Hell Divers
January 19
Broken Lullaby
January 22
Charlie Chan's Chance
January 23
Taxi!
February 1932
February 6
The Passionate Plumber
February 12
Shanghai Express
February 13
The Beast of the City
February 18
Law and Order
February 20
Freaks
The Man Who Played God
February 21
 Murders in the Rue Morgue
March 1932
March 1
Impatient Maiden
March 6
Business and Pleasure
March 22
One Hour with You
March 24
Das blaue Licht (Germany)
March 30
Santa (Mexico)
No Man Of Her Own (1932 film not to be confused with the 1950 film of the same title)

April–June
April 1932
April 2
Tarzan the Ape Man
April 9
Scarface
April 17
Young America
April 18
Night After Night (France)
April 29
Grand Hotel
May 1932
May 6
Vampyr
May 7
The Mouthpiece
May 12
The Sign of Four
May 14
Kuhle Wampe oder: Wem gehört die Welt? (Germany)
May 17
The Last of the Mohicans
May 20
Cruiser Emden
Raid in St. Pauli
May 21
Attorney for the Defense
May 28
As You Desire Me
Two Seconds
June 1932
June 2
What Price Hollywood?
June 3
I Was Born, But... (Japan)
June 8
L'Atlantide (Germany/France)
The Dark Horse
June 17
Is My Face Red?
June 25
Red-Headed Woman

July–September
July 1932
July 8
Million Dollar Legs
July 18
Hotel Splendide
July 28
White Zombie
August 1932
August 4
American Madness
Back Street
August 6
Downstairs
August 10
Horse Feathers
August 12
Devil and the Deep
Movie Crazy
August 13
Jewel Robbery
Speak Easily
August 17
The Last Mile
August 18
The Bartered Bride (Germany)
Love Me Tonight
August 19
The Age of Consent
Mr. Robinson Crusoe
August 20
Crooner
September 1932
September 10
Big City Blues
September 13
Bird of Paradise
September 16
Blonde Venus
The Most Dangerous Game
September 17
Pack Up Your Troubles
September 18
Off His Base
September 22
Tiger Shark
September 23
A Blonde Dream (Ein blonder Traum) (Germany)
The Phantom President
September 24
Smilin' Through
September 30
A Bill of Divorcement

October–December
October 1932
October 8
The Big Stampede
October 12
Rain
October 14
The Big Broadcast
October 15
Cabin in the Cotton
Faithless
Thirteen Women
October 20
The Old Dark House
October 21
Trouble in Paradise
October 22
Red Dust
October 25
Virtue
October 28
Fanny (France)
Lord Camber's Ladies (GB)
October 29
Three on a Match
October 30
Night After Night
November 1932
November 2
Scarlet Dawn
November 3
Air Mail
November 4
Odds 777
Spring Shower (Hungary/France)
November 7
Payment Deferred
November 8
Happy Ever After (UK/Germany)
November 10
I Am a Fugitive from a Chain Gang
November 11
Boudu Saved from Drowning 
November 24
Call Her Savage
December 1932
December 1
Silver Dollar
December 2
If I Had a Million
December 3
A Simple Case 
Me and My Gal
December 8
A Farewell to Arms
Flesh
December 16
Anton Spelec, Sharp-Shooter (Czechoslovakia)
Fast Life
December 22
The Mummy
They Just Had to Get Married
December 23
Rasputin and the Empress
December 24
20,000 Years in Sing Sing
December 25
The Sign of the Cross
December 28
The Animal Kingdom
December 30
No Man of Her Own

Notable films released in 1932
United States unless stated

#
20,000 Years in Sing Sing, directed by Michael Curtiz, starring Spencer Tracy and Bette Davis

A
The Age of Consent, directed by Gregory La Cava
Air Mail, directed by John Ford, starring Ralph Bellamy, Gloria Stuart and Pat O'Brien
American Madness, directed by Frank Capra, starring Walter Huston and Pat O'Brien
The Animal Kingdom, directed by Edward H. Griffith, starring Ann Harding, Leslie Howard and Myrna Loy
Anton Spelec, Sharp-Shooter (Anton Špelec, ostrostřelec), directed by Martin Frič – (Czechoslovakia)
As You Desire Me, directed by George Fitzmaurice, starring Greta Garbo, Melvyn Douglas and Erich von Stroheim
L'Atlantide, directed by G. W. Pabst, starring Brigitte Helm – (Germany/France)
Attorney for the Defense, directed by Irving Cummings, starring Edmund Lowe and Evelyn Brent

B
Back Street, directed by John M. Stahl, starring Irene Dunne and John Boles
The Bartered Bride (Die verkaufte Braut), directed by Max Ophüls – (Germany)
The Beast of the City, directed by Charles Brabin, starring Walter Huston, Jean Harlow and Wallace Ford
The Big Broadcast, directed by Frank Tuttle, starring Bing Crosby and Leila Hyams
Big City Blues, directed by Mervyn LeRoy, starring Joan Blondell and Eric Linden
The Big Stampede, directed by Tenny Wright, starring John Wayne and Noah Beery
A Bill of Divorcement, directed by George Cukor, starring John Barrymore, Katharine Hepburn and Billie Burke
Bird of Paradise, directed by King Vidor, starring Dolores del Río and Joel McCrea
Das blaue Licht (The Blue Light), starring and directed by Leni Riefenstahl – (Germany)
A Blonde Dream (Ein blonder Traum), directed by Paul Martin, starring Lilian Harvey, Willy Fritsch and Willi Forst – (Germany)
Blonde Venus, directed by Josef von Sternberg, starring Marlene Dietrich, Herbert Marshall and Cary Grant
Blondie of the Follies, directed by Edmund Goulding, starring Marion Davies, Robert Montgomery, Billie Dove, and Jimmy Durante
Boudu Saved from Drowning (Boudu sauvé des eaux), directed by Jean Renoir, starring Michel Simon – (France)
Broken Lullaby, directed by Ernst Lubitsch, starring Lionel Barrymore
Business and Pleasure, directed by David Butler, starring Will Rogers

C
The Cabin in the Cotton, directed by Michael Curtiz, starring Richard Barthelmess and Bette Davis
Call Her Savage, directed by John Francis Dillon, starring Clara Bow, Gilbert Roland and Thelma Todd
Charlie Chan's Chance (lost), directed by John G. Blystone, starring Warner Oland
Cruiser Emden (Kreuzer Emden), starring and directed by Louis Ralph – (Germany)

D
Dance Pretty Lady, directed by Anthony Asquith – (GB)
Dancers in the Dark, directed by David Burton, starring Miriam Hopkins and Jack Oakie
The Dark Horse, directed by Alfred E. Green, starring Warren William and Bette Davis
The Dentist, directed by Leslie Pearce, starring W. C. Fields
Destry Rides Again, directed by Benjamin Stoloff, starring Tom Mix
Devil and the Deep, directed by Marion Gering, starring Tallulah Bankhead, Gary Cooper, Charles Laughton and Cary Grant
Downstairs, directed by Monta Bell, starring John Gilbert

E–F
Emma, directed by Clarence Brown, starring Marie Dressler and Myrna Loy
F.P.1 (F.P.1 antwortet nicht), directed by Karl Hartl – (Germany)
Faithless, directed by Harry Beaumont, starring Tallulah Bankhead and Robert Montgomery
Fanny, directed by Marc Allégret, starring Raimu – (France)
A Farewell to Arms, directed by Frank Borzage, starring Helen Hayes, Gary Cooper and Adolphe Menjou
Fast Life, directed by Harry A. Pollard, starring William Haines, Madge Evans and Conrad Nagel
Flesh, directed by John Ford, starring Wallace Beery, Ricardo Cortez and Karen Morley
Flowers and Trees, a Walt Disney animated short
Forbidden, directed by Frank Capra, starring Barbara Stanwyck, Adolphe Menjou and Ralph Bellamy
Freaks, directed by Tod Browning, starring Wallace Ford and Leila Hyams

G–H
Goodnight, Vienna, directed by Herbert Wilcox, starring Jack Buchanan and Anna Neagle – (GB)
Grand Hotel, directed by Edmund Goulding, starring Greta Garbo, John Barrymore, Joan Crawford, Wallace Beery, Lionel Barrymore and Lewis Stone
Horse Feathers, directed by Norman Z. McLeod, starring the Marx Brothers and Thelma Todd
Hotel Splendide, directed by Michael Powell – (GB)

I
I Am a Fugitive from a Chain Gang, directed by Mervyn LeRoy, starring Paul Muni and Glenda Farrell
I Was Born, But... (Otona no miru ehon – Umarete wa mita keredo), directed by Yasujirō Ozu – (Japan)
If I Had a Million, starring Gary Cooper, George Raft, Charles Laughton, Jack Oakie and W. C. Fields
The Impatient Maiden, directed by James Whale, starring Lew Ayres and Mae Clarke
Island of Lost Souls, directed by Erle C. Kenton, starring Charles Laughton, Bela Lugosi, Richard Arlen and Leila Hyams, based on the 1896 novel The Island of Dr. Moreau by H. G. Wells
Ivan – directed by Alexander Dovzhenko – (U.S.S.R.)

J–K
Jack's the Boy directed by Walter Forde, starring Jack Hulbert – (GB)
Jewel Robbery, directed by William Dieterle, starring William Powell and Kay Francis
The Kid from Spain, directed by Leo McCarey, starring Eddie Cantor
Kuhle Wampe, oder: Wem gehört die Welt? (Kuhle Wampe, or: Who Owns the World?), directed by Slatan Dudow – (Germany)

L
The Last Mile, directed by Samuel Bischoff, starring Preston Foster
The Last of the Mohicans, 12-part serial directed by Ford Beebe and B. Reeves Eason, starring Harry Carey
Law and Order, directed by Edward L. Cahn, starring Walter Huston and Harry Carey
Lord Camber's Ladies, directed by Benn Levy, starring Gerald du Maurier and Gertrude Lawrence – (GB)
The Local Bad Man, directed by Otto Brower, starring Hoot Gibson
Love Me Tonight, directed by Rouben Mamoulian, starring Maurice Chevalier, Jeanette MacDonald and Myrna Loy
The Lucky Number, directed by Anthony Asquith, starring Gordon Harker – (GB)

M
The Man Who Played God, directed by John G. Adolfi, starring George Arliss and Bette Davis
Me and My Gal, directed by Raoul Walsh, starring Spencer Tracy and Joan Bennett
Merrily We Go to Hell, directed by Dorothy Arzner, starring Sylvia Sidney and Fredric March
The Midshipmaid, directed by Albert de Courville, starring Jessie Matthews – (GB)
Million Dollar Legs, directed by Edward F. Cline, starring Jack Oakie and W. C. Fields
 The Missing Rembrandt (lost), directed by Leslie S. Hiscott, starring Arthur Wontner and Ian Fleming – (GB)
The Most Dangerous Game, directed by Ernest B. Schoedsack and Irving Pichel, starring Joel McCrea, Fay Wray, Leslie Banks and Robert Armstrong
The Mouthpiece, directed by James Flood and Elliott Nugent, starring Warren William
Movie Crazy, directed by Clyde Bruckman, starring Harold Lloyd
Mr. Robinson Crusoe, directed by A. Edward Sutherland, starring Douglas Fairbanks
The Mummy, directed by Karl Freund, starring Boris Karloff
Murders in the Rue Morgue, directed by Robert Florey, starring Bela Lugosi and Sidney Fox

N–O
Night After Night, directed by Archie Mayo, starring George Raft and Mae West
Night at the Crossroads (La Nuit du carrefour), directed by Jean Renoir – (France)
No Man of Her Own, directed by Wesley Ruggles, starring Clark Gable and Carole Lombard
Odds 777, directed by George Schnéevoigt – (Denmark)
The Old Dark House, directed by James Whale, starring Boris Karloff, Melvyn Douglas, Gloria Stuart, Charles Laughton and Raymond Massey
One Hour with You, directed by Ernst Lubitsch, starring Maurice Chevalier and Jeanette MacDonald
One Way Passage, directed by Tay Garnett, starring William Powell and Kay Francis

P
Pack Up Your Troubles, directed by George Marshall and Ray McCarey, starring Laurel and Hardy
The Passionate Plumber, directed by Edward Sedgwick, starring Buster Keaton and Jimmy Durante
Payment Deferred, directed by Lothar Mendes, starring Charles Laughton and Maureen O'Sullivan
The Phantom President, directed by Norman Taurog, starring George M. Cohan, Claudette Colbert and Jimmy Durante
Polly of the Circus, directed by Alfred Santell, starring Marion Davies and Clark Gable
Prosperity, directed by Sam Wood, starring Marie Dressler, Polly Moran and Anita Page

R
Rain, directed by Lewis Milestone, starring Joan Crawford and Walter Huston
Rasputin and the Empress, directed by Richard Boleslawski, starring John Barrymore, Ethel Barrymore and Lionel Barrymore
Rasputin, Demon with Women (Rasputin, Dämon der Frauen), directed by Adolf Trotz, starring Conrad Veidt – (Germany)
Raid in St. Pauli (Razzia in St. Pauli), directed by Werner Hochbaum – (Germany)
Red Dust, directed by Victor Fleming, starring Clark Gable, Jean Harlow, Mary Astor and Gene Raymond
Red-Haired Alibi, directed by Christy Cabanne
Red-Headed Woman, directed by Jack Conway, starring Jean Harlow, Chester Morris, Lewis Stone, Leila Hyams and Una Merkel
Rome Express, directed by Walter Forde, starring Esther Ralston and Conrad Veidt – (GB)

S
Santa, directed by Antonio Moreno, starring Lupita Tovar – (Mexico)
Scarface, directed by Howard Hawks, starring Paul Muni, Ann Dvorak, George Raft and Boris Karloff
Scarlet Dawn, directed by William Dieterle, starring Douglas Fairbanks Jr. and Nancy Carroll
Shanghai Express, directed by Josef von Sternberg, starring Marlene Dietrich, Clive Brook, Anna May Wong and Warner Oland
Sherlock Holmes, directed by William K. Howard, starring Clive Brook and Ernest Torrence
The Sign of Four, directed by Graham Cutts, starring Arthur Wontner and Ian Hunter – (GB)
The Sign of the Cross, directed by Cecil B. DeMille, starring Fredric March, Claudette Colbert and Charles Laughton
Silver Dollar, directed by Alfred E. Green, starring Edward G. Robinson and Bebe Daniels
A Simple Case, directed by Vsevolod Pudovkin and Mikhail Doller – (USSR)
Smilin' Through, directed by Sidney Franklin, starring Norma Shearer, Fredric March and Leslie Howard
Speak Easily, directed by Edward Sedgwick, starring Buster Keaton, Jimmy Durante and Thelma Todd
Spring Shower (Tavaszi zápor), directed by Pál Fejős – (France/Hungary)
Strange Interlude, directed by Robert Z. Leonard, starring Norma Shearer and Clark Gable

T
Tarzan the Ape Man, directed by W. S. Van Dyke, starring Johnny Weissmuller, Maureen O'Sullivan and Neil Hamilton
Taxi!, directed by Roy Del Ruth, starring James Cagney and Loretta Young
They Just Had to Get Married, directed by Edward Ludwig, starring Slim Summerville and ZaSu Pitts
Thirteen Women, directed by George Archainbaud, starring Irene Dunne, Ricardo Cortez and Myrna Loy
Three Modern Women (Sāngè Módēng Nǚxìng) (lost), directed by Bu Wancang, starring Ruan Lingyu and Jin Yan – (China)
Three on a Match, directed by Mervyn LeRoy, starring Joan Blondell, Warren William, Ann Dvorak and Bette Davis
Tiger Shark, directed by Howard Hawks, starring Edward G. Robinson and Richard Arlen
Trouble in Paradise, directed by Ernst Lubitsch, starring Miriam Hopkins, Kay Francis and Herbert Marshall
Two Seconds, directed by Mervyn LeRoy, starring Edward G. Robinson

U–V
The Undertaker (Funebrák), directed by Karel Lamač – (Czechoslovakia)
Unheimliche Geschichten (Uncanny Stories), directed by Richard Oswald, starring Paul Wegener – (Germany)
Union Depot, directed by Alfred E. Green, starring Douglas Fairbanks Jr. and Joan Blondell
Vampyr, directed by Carl Theodor Dreyer – (Germany/France)
Virtue, directed by Edward Buzzell, starring Carole Lombard and Pat O'Brien

W–Y
Washington Merry-Go-Round, directed by James Cruze, starring Lee Tracy
What Price Hollywood?, directed by George Cukor, starring Constance Bennett, Lowell Sherman and Neil Hamilton
What Scoundrels Men Are! (Gli uomini, che mascalzoni!), directed by Mario Camerini, starring Vittorio De Sica – (Italy)
White Zombie, directed by Victor Halperin, starring Bela Lugosi
Wooden Crosses (Les Croix de Bois), directed by Raymond Bernard – (France)
Young America, directed by Frank Borzage, starring Spencer Tracy and Ralph Bellamy

Serials

Ordered by release date:
January 4: Detective Lloyd, 12 chapters (216 min) 
February 1: The Shadow of the Eagle, 12 chapters (218 minutes)
March 28: The Airmail Mystery, 12 chapters (225 min)
May 17: The Last of the Mohicans, 12 chapters (231 minutes) 
June 20: Heroes of the West, 12 chapters (225 min)
August 1: The Hurricane Express, 12 chapters (227 min)
September 5: The Last Frontier, 12 chapters (213 minutes)
September 12: Jungle Mystery, 12 chapters (240 min)
November 1: The Devil Horse, 12 chapters (216 min)
December 5: The Lost Special, 12 chapters (240 minutes)

Short film series

Ordered by release date:
Buster Keaton (1917–1923, 1934–1937, 1939–1941)
Laurel and Hardy (1927–1935); the team later made one instructional short subject, released nontheatrically in 1943
Our Gang (1922–1944) The series was officially called both Our Gang and Hal Roach's Rascals until 1932, when Our Gang became the sole title of the series.
Shirley Temple (1932–1934)

Animated short film series
Ordered by release date of the film series. This list only includes shorts released in 1932:
Aesop's Film Fables (1921–1933)
Krazy Kat (1925–1940)
Oswald the Lucky Rabbit (1927–1938)
Mickey Mouse (1928–1953)
Silly Symphonies (1929–1939)
 The Bird Store
 The Bears and the Bees
 Just Dogs
 Flowers and Trees
 King Neptune
 Bugs in Love
 Babes in the Woods
 Santa's Workshop
Screen Songs (1929–1938)
Sweet Jennie Lee (January 9)
Show Me the Way to Go Home (January 30)
When the Red, Red Robin Comes Bob, Bob, Bobbin' Along (February 19)
Wait Till the Sun Shines, Nellie (March 4)
Just One More Chance (April 1)
Oh! How I Hate to Get Up in the Morning (April 22)
Shine On Harvest Moon (May 6)
Let Me Call You Sweetheart (May 20)
I Ain't Got Nobody (June 17)
You Try Somebody Else (July 29)
Rudy Vallee Melodies (August 5)
Down Among the Sugar Cane (August 26)
Just a Gigolo (September 9)
School Days (September 30)
Romantic Melodies (October 21)
When It's Sleepy Time Down South (November 11)
Sing a Song (December 2)
Time on My Hands (December 23)
Talkartoons (1929–1932)
 Minnie the Moocher (featuring Betty Boop)
 Sink or Swim S.O.S (featuring Betty Boop)
Looney Tunes (1930–1969)
Bosko's Store
Bosko and Honey
Bosko the Lumberjack
Bosko and Bruno
Bosko's Party
Flip the Frog (1930–1933)
Terrytoons (1930–1964)
Merrie Melodies (1931–1969)
Scrappy (1931–1941)
Tom and Jerry (Van Beuren) (1931–1933)
Betty Boop (1932–1939)
 Stopping the Show
 Betty Boop's Bizzy Bee
 Betty Boop, M.D.
 Betty Boop's Bamboo Isle
 Betty Boop's Ups and Down
 Betty Boop for President
 I'll Be Glad When You're Dead, You Rascal You
 Betty Boop's Museum
Pooch the Pup (1932–1933)
 The Athlete (August 29)
 The Butcher Boy (September 26)
 The Crowd Snores (October 24)
 The Under Dog (November 7)
 Cats and Dogs (December 5)
Flowers and Trees (1933)

Births
January 3 – Dabney Coleman, American character actor
January 4 
Carlos Saura, Spanish director (died 2023)
Richard Stahl, American comic actor (died 2006)
January 11 – Alfonso Arau, Mexican filmmaker, actor and singer
January 19 – Richard Lester, American-born director working in England
January 22 – Piper Laurie, American actress
January 23 – James Rado, American actor, playwright, director and composer (died 2022)
February 3 – Peggy Ann Garner, American actress (died 1984)
February 6 – François Truffaut, French director (died 1984)
February 8 – John Williams, American film composer
February 13
Susan Oliver, American actress (died 1990)
Barbara Shelley, English actress, "The First Leading Lady of British Horror" (died 2021)
February 14
Harriet Andersson, Swedish actress
Alexander Kluge, German director
February 18 – Miloš Forman, Czech-born director (died 2018)
February 23 – Majel Barrett, American actress (died 2008)
February 24 – Michel Legrand, French film composer (died 2019)
February 27 – Elizabeth Taylor, English-American actress (died 2011)
February 28 – Francisco Colmenero, Mexican voice actor and voice director
March 14 – Hiroshi Ōtake, Japanese actor and voice actor (died 2022)
March 27 – Robert Sacchi, Italian-American character actor (died 2021)
March 31 – Nagisa Oshima, Japanese director (died 2013)
April 1 – Debbie Reynolds, American singer, actress and dancer (died 2016)
April 4 
Anthony Perkins, American actor (died 1992)
Andrei Tarkovsky, Russian director (died 1986)
April 9 - Jack Smethurst, English actor (died 2022)
April 10 
Delphine Seyrig, French actress (died 1990)
Omar Sharif, Egyptian actor (died 2015)
April 11 - Joel Grey, American actor, singer, dancer and director
April 21 - Elaine May, American comedian, director, screenwriter, playwright and actor
April 25 - William Roache, English actor
April 26 – Francis Lai, French film composer (died 2018)
April 27
Anouk Aimée, French actress
Casey Kasem, American disc jockey, music historian, radio personality, actor and voice actor (died 2014)
May 2 - Bruce Glover, American character actor
May 8 - Phyllida Law, Scottish actress
May 9 - Geraldine McEwan, English actress (died 2015)
May 22 - Seth Sakai, American actor (died 2007)
May 15 - John Glen (director), retired English director and editor
May 27 - Steve Franken, American actor (died 2012)
June 6
Anne Claire Poirier, Canadian director, producer and screenwriter
Billie Whitelaw, English actress (died 2014)
June 10 – Branko Lustig, Croatian-born producer (died 2019)
June 11 – Athol Fugard, South African playwright, actor and director
June 13 – Bob McGrath, American actor, singer and musician (died 2022)
June 17 – Peter Lupus, American bodybuilder and actor
June 18
David Herriot, Irish actor (died 2000)
Sérgio Ricardo, Brazilian director and composer (died 2020)
June 19 – Marisa Pavan, Italian actress
June 22
Amrish Puri, Indian actor (died 2005)
Prunella Scales, English actress
June 29 – Soon-Tek Oh, Korean-American actor (died 2018)
July 1 – Sonny Caldinez, Trinidadian actor, previously professional wrestler (died 2022)
July 10 – Neile Adams, Filipino-American actress, singer and dancer
July 29 – Mike Hodges, English screenwriter and director (died 2022)
July 30 – Edd Byrnes, American actor (died 2020)
August 2 – Peter O'Toole, Anglo-Irish actor (died 2013)
August 5 – Ja'Net DuBois, American actress, singer and dancer (Good Times) (died 2020)
August 9 – Denys Hawthorne, Irish actor (died 2009)
August 15 – Bob Elkins, American character actor (died 2022)
August 24 – W. Morgan Sheppard, English actor and voice actor (died 2019)
September 3 – Eileen Brennan, American actress (died 2013)
September 4 – Edward de Souza, British character actor
September 5 – Carol Lawrence, American actress
September 12 – Kim Hamilton, American actress (died 2013)
September 16 - George Chakiris, American actor
September 21 – Mickey Kuhn, American actor (died 2022)
September 26 – Richard Herd, American actor (died 2020)
September 29 – Mehmood Ali, Indian actor, director and producer (died 2004)
October 4
Felicia Farr, American actress and model
Edward Judd, British actor (died 2009)
October 6 - Anna Quayle, English actress (died 2019)
October 13
Dušan Makavejev, Serbian director (died 2019)
Liliane Montevecchi, French-Italian actress and singer (died 2018)
October 20 – William Christopher, American actor (died 2016)
October 22 - Sheila Allen (English actress), English actress (died 2011)
October 30 - Louis Malle, French director, screenwriter and producer (died 1995)
November 1 - John Clark (actor), English actor, director, producer and writer
November 2 - Terry Richards, British actor and stuntman (died 2014)
November 10 – Roy Scheider, American actor (died 2008)
November 12 - Jerry Douglas, American actor (died 2021)
November 13
Al Mancini, American actor (died 2007)
Richard Mulligan, American actor (died 2000)
J. A. Preston, American actor
November 15 – Petula Clark, English singer, actress and film composer
November 20 - Richard Dawson, English-American actor, comedian and game-show host (died 2012)
November 22 – Robert Vaughn, American actor (died 2016)
December 7 – Ellen Burstyn, American actress
December 28 – Nichelle Nichols, American actress (died 2022)

Deaths
February 15 – Minnie Maddern Fiske, American stage star, also appeared in silent films (born 1865)
June 30 – Bruno Kastner, German actor (born 1890)
July 17 – Rasmus Rasmussen, Norwegian actor (born 1862)  
August 1 – James R. Quirk, American editor and publisher of Photoplay magazine (born 1884)
August 10 – Rin Tin Tin, canine actor (born 1918)
September 1 – Guy Oliver, American actor (born 1878)
September 16 – Peg Entwistle, British-born American actress (born 1908)
November 27 – Evelyn Preer, American actress, singer (born 1896)

Film debuts
 Ingrid Bergman – Landskamp
 Robert Donat – Men of Tomorrow
 Cary Grant – This Is the Night
 George O'Hanlon – The Death Kiss
 Louis Hayward – Self Made Lady
 Paul Henreid – Baroud
 Katharine Hepburn – A Bill of Divorcement
 Alan Ladd – Tom Brown of Culver
 Anna Lee – Ebb Tide
 John Mills – Midshipmaid Gob
 David Niven – There Goes the Bride
 Jean Parker – Divorce in the Family
 Dick Powell – Blessed Event
 Tyrone Power – Tom Brown of Culver
 Gloria Stuart – Street of Women
 Jessica Tandy – The Indiscretions of Eve
 Jacques Tati – Oscar, champion de tennis
 Shirley Temple – Runt Page
 Mae West – Night After Night
 Jane Withers – Handle with Care
 Jane Wyman – The Kid from Spain

References

Bibliography
 

 
Film by year